Nooray Bhatti (born Noor Parvez Bhatty; 20 September 1985) is Pakistani supermodel. She is regarded as one of the top models of Pakistan. Nooray has established herself as a leading model of Pakistani fashion industry and has been nominated four times for Best Model Female. She received her first Hum Award nomination at 3rd Hum Awards, as Best Model Female and consecutive nomination at 4th Hum Awards, in same category.

Career
Bhatti started her career in 2003 with her first photo shoot by Khawar Riaz. Who was also responsible for convincing her to join the industry. She has worked with Tapu Javeri as her debut into the world of modeling. In an interview with The Express Tribune, She recalled, "It just happened to me. My older sister Sadaf Pervez was a well-known model and she knew many people in the fashion industry but back then I was busy with school and not really interested," She was then approached by Khawar casually who took her pictures and she appeared on a magazine cover; she said, "There was no looking back from there on. Still it was never my dream to enter this industry, it just happened." She has modeled for Fahad Hussayn Rizwan Beyg, Umar Sayeed, Nilofer Shahid, Deepak Perwani, Karma, Maria B, Amir Adnan and many others. She regularly appears on PFDC Sunsilk Fashion Week and Pakistan Fashion Week.

Awards and nominations

References

External links
 
 Nooray Bhatty at Lux

Living people
Pakistani female models
People from Lahore
1985 births